Jocelyn Lees (born 19 November 1965 in Auckland, New Zealand) is a shooting competitor for New Zealand.

She won her first Commonwealth Games medal in the 1994 Commonwealth Games, gaining a silver in the women's 10 metre air pistol (pairs) partnering Gerd Barkman. At the 1998 Commonwealth Games partnering Tania Corrigan she won two silver medals; one in the 10 metre air pistol (pairs) and one in the 25 metre pistol (pairs) event. Four years later at the 2002 Commonwealth Games she won two bronze medals; one in the women's 25 metre pistol event, and another in the 25 metre pistol (pairs) event again alongside Tania Corrigan.

References

Living people
1965 births
New Zealand female sport shooters
ISSF rifle shooters
Olympic shooters of New Zealand
Shooters at the 1992 Summer Olympics
Commonwealth Games silver medallists for New Zealand
Commonwealth Games bronze medallists for New Zealand
Shooters at the 1994 Commonwealth Games
Shooters at the 1998 Commonwealth Games
Shooters at the 2002 Commonwealth Games
Commonwealth Games medallists in shooting
Medallists at the 1994 Commonwealth Games
Medallists at the 1998 Commonwealth Games
Medallists at the 2002 Commonwealth Games